See also List of Platinum singles in the United Kingdom awarded since 2000, List of million-selling singles in the United Kingdom.

On 1 April 1973 the British Phonographic Industry (BPI) launched the Certified Awards scheme for singles and albums. From then until 1988, Platinum was awarded to singles with sales or shipments of 1 million (with double or triple Platinum being introduced in 1985).

In 1989, the thresholds were changed so that a single with sales or shipments of 600,000 became eligible for Platinum (and any multiples thereof). The only song to be certified Platinum during both periods is "Bohemian Rhapsody" by Queen (in its original release in 1975 and again in 1991 following the death of Freddie Mercury), while the Spice Girls had the most Platinum singles awarded before 2000 with eight. This total has been passed in the 21st century by Rihanna with 13.

Awards from 1973–1988 (1 million units)

2× Platinum (available 1985 onwards)
Only one single was ever awarded a multi-Platinum certification during the 1 million unit era, although "Do They Know It's Christmas?" by Band Aid would also have qualified.

Platinum (1973–1988)

Awards from 1989–1999 (600,000 units)

Multi-Platinum
Only one single was awarded a multiple above double: "Candle in the Wind 1997"/"Something About the Way You Look Tonight" by Elton John which is certified as 9× Platinum for shipping over 5.4 million units, following the funeral of Diana, Princess of Wales in 1997.

9× Platinum

2× Platinum

Awarded triple platinum after 2000
Also awarded double platinum in 2013

Platinum awards

Certified 2× Platinum since 2000

References

British music-related lists
Lists of best-selling singles in the United Kingdom
1980s in British music
1990s in British music
Music recording certifications